Firuzi (also Romanized as Fīrūzī; also known as Fīrūzī-ye Sar Tom) is a village in Shahidabad Rural District, Mashhad-e Morghab District, Khorrambid County, Fars Province, Iran. At the 2006 census, its population was 69, in 13 families.

References 

Populated places in Khorrambid County